Daniella Okeke  is a Nigerian actress. In 2013, she starred as "Joke" in Lagos Cougars, a role that earned her the Best Actress in a Leading Role nomination at both the 10th Africa Movie Academy Awards and 2014 Nigeria Entertainment Awards.

Personal life
Okeke was born on 26 March 1977. She hails from Imo State. Okeke is a lover of luxury cars

Filmography
Sleek Ladies (2007)
Stronger than Pain (2007)
Lagos Cougars

References

External links

Nigerian film actresses
Living people
21st-century Nigerian actresses
Igbo actresses
Actresses from Imo State
1977 births
Nigerian television personalities